The discography of American singer and songwriter and producer Andra Day consists of one studio album, one soundtrack, one video album, two extended plays, and 16 singles as a lead artist (as well as five as a featured artist)

Albums

Studio albums

Soundtrack albums

Video albums

Extended plays

Singles

As lead artist

As featured artist

Other charted songs

Other appearances

Notes

References

Discographies of American artists
Contemporary R&B discographies
Pop music discographies
Soul music discographies